Mili is a 2022 Indian Hindi-language survival thriller film directed by Mathukutty Xavier, and is a remake of his own 2019 Malayalam-language film Helen. Produced by Boney Kapoor and Zee Studios, the film stars Janhvi Kapoor, Sunny Kaushal and Manoj Pahwa. It follows the titular character Mili Naudiyal, who gets stuck in a freezer and fights to stay alive.

Principal photography took place from August to November 2021 in Mumbai and Dehradun. The film's music was composed by A. R. Rahman with lyrics written by Javed Akhtar. It was distributed by Zee Studios and released theatrically on 4 November 2022. The film received mixed reviews from critics, with praise for Pahwa's performance. This film was a box office bomb

Plot 
Mili Naudiyal is a B.Sc Nursing graduate and attends IELTS coaching classes intended for a job abroad. She works part-time at a restaurant named Doon's Kitchen, located within a plush mall. She lives with her father Niranjan Naudiyal, who does not like her going to Canada and has disagreements with Mili. Unknown to Niranjan, Mili has a boyfriend Sameer Kumar, who is in search of a job.

One night, while Sameer is riding Mili to her home, they are stopped by police who penalise him for not wearing a helmet and drunken driving, they both are brought to the police station. Niranjan is summoned to the station, and is in dismay of seeing his daughter and does not talk to her despite her several attempts of creating conversation. The next night after work at Doon's Kitchen, Mili's manager Sudheer Malkoti unknowingly locks her in the freezer room. At -18 °C, Mili has to survive in the freezing cold and tries everything to keep herself alive. She tries to block the exhaust fan but ended up dislocating her leg. She starts to get frostbite and bleeding through her nose.

Niranjan starts getting worried that Mili has not reached home. He searches for Mili with the help of his neighbour. They call all her co-workers but they all say they do not know anything. Sameer, who was on his way to Delhi half-heartedly, returns and also joins the investigation. They go to the police station to file a complaint but they are greeted by an SI Satish Rawat, whom they met the day before. He suspects Sameer. Niranjan tries to defend him and this causes a feud between Rawat and the search party. He deliberately tries not to help them by not sharing the last tower location of Mili he got from Cyber cell. They get a clue that Mili might have had a problem with the auto drivers in front of the mall. They all reach there to enquire. The auto driver whom they suspect denies the allegation.

At this point, they meet a watchman of the mall who says that Mili might not have left the mall because he usually notices her going in and out. They open the freezer after five hours and find Mili. She is taken to the hospital just before she had the last stage of hypothermia. Then Niranjan enquires with the watchman about how was he sure that Mili did not leave the mall. The watchman says Mili smiles at him every time she comes in and out of the mall. He did not see her go out on the day of her missing. Mili reunites with her father and Sameer. The doctor says that she is out of danger and she needs physiotherapy later. He continues that its difficult for any common man or woman to survive that cold weather and Mili is a brave girl. Meanwhile, Malkhoti is warned by a police officer that he must install an alarm in the freezer or else he will face consequences. When the watchman asks Niranjan what his daughter's name is, Niranjan proudly replies, "Mili".

Cast 
 Janhvi Kapoor as Mili Naudiyal
 Sunny Kaushal as Sameer Kumar
 Manoj Pahwa as Niranjan Naudiyal
 Seema Pahwa as Devki Negi
 Jackie Shroff as an inmate (special appearance)
 Hasleen Kaur as Hasleen
 Rajesh Jais as Mohan Chachu
 Vikram Kochhar as Sudheer Malkoti
 Anurag Arora as SI Satish Rawat
 Sanjay Suri as Inspector Ravi Prasad
 Joginder Goyat as Shyam
 Raghav Binani as Ladoo

Production 
In August 2020, Boney Kapoor bought the rights to remake the Malayalam film Helen (2019) in Hindi. The title of the remake, Mili, was announced a year later. Mathukutty Xavier, the director of the original, was retained for the remake too. He recalled in 2021 that he had refused an offer to remake Helen in Hindi, but when contacted by Kapoor who wanted his daughter Janhvi to star in a potential remake, agreed. Noble Babu Thomas who portrayed a lead character in Helen, served as the remake's creative director. Ritesh Shah was hired as the screenwriter to help adapt the script to suit Hindi-speaking audiences. Ranjith Ambady, the makeup artist from the original, was retained in the same position.

Janhvi portrays the title character, Mili Naudiyal. Sunny Kaushal, who portrays Mili's boyfriend, sought not to imitate Noble Babu Thomas, who portrayed the role in the original, but give his own interpretation. Mathukutty Xavier considered having Boney portray Mili's father, but decided against it as he felt it was "gimmicky" to have one's real father portray their screen father too. The role went to Manoj Pahwa.

Principal photography was supposed to have begun in June 2021, but got delayed due to the second wave of the COVID-19 pandemic in India. It ultimately commenced on 5 August 2021 in Mumbai. The scenes depicting Mili stuck in a freezer were shot in an actual freezer. These scenes, along with other indoor scenes were filmed in Mumbai, while the scenes depicting the mall where Mili works were filmed at Dehradun due to malls in Mumbai being closed at the time. Janhvi underwent "intense preparation" to portray her character, and said the filming process affected her both "physically and mentally". Filming wrapped on 26 November 2021.

Soundtrack 

The music is composed by A. R. Rahman and lyrics are written by Javed Akhtar. The first single "Sun Aye Mili" was released on 22 October 2022. The second single "Tum Bhi Raahi" was released on 27 October 2022.

Release and reception 
Mili was released on 4 November 2022, and received mixed reviews, though critics praised Kapoor's performance. Sukanya Verma of Rediff.com rated the film 3.5 out of 5 stars and wrote "Mili establishes Janhvi Kapoor as an actor striving to be taken seriously". Bollywood Hungama rated the film 3 out of 5 stars and termed the film as a "gripping thriller" and also praised the performance of Kapoor. Saibal Chatterjee of NDTV rated the film 3 out of 5 stars and wrote "It has its moments and a pivotal performance that demonstrates that Janhvi Kapoor is an actress who has the chops to carry an entire film on her shoulders". Avinash Lohana of Pinkvilla rated the film 3 out of 5 stars and called the film a "sincere attempt" and also appreciated the performance of Janhvi and the latter half, all combined the film doesn't create a strong impact.

Renuka Vyavahare of The Times of India rated the film 2.5 out of 5 stars and stated "Mili lacks the nerve-wracking, gripping intensity that is most essential to this genre." Shubhra Gupta of The Indian Express rated the film 2 out of 5 stars and wrote "The survival thriller has its moments and Janhvi Kapoor puts in the work. However, the pace slackens and bloat becomes the problem." Shubham Kulkarni of Koimoi rated the film 2 out of 5 stars and wrote "For the ones who have seen the original, this is a story visually lived and moved by, so it doesn't make a difference when bad things happen because they are completely similar."

Home media 
The satellite and streaming rights were purchased by Zee Cinema and Netflix respectively. The film started streaming digitally on Netflix from 30 December 2022.

References

External links 
 
 Mili at Bollywood Hungama

2020s Hindi-language films
2020s survival films
2022 thriller films
Films about father–daughter relationships
Films scored by A. R. Rahman
Films shot in Mumbai
Hindi remakes of Malayalam films
Indian survival films
Indian thriller films